George F. L. Charles Airport (commonly known as Vigie Airport)  is the smaller of the two airports in Saint Lucia, the other being Hewanorra International Airport. George F. L. Charles Airport is managed by the Saint Lucia Air and Seaports Authority (SLASPA). Its runway runs parallel to a pristine beach, Vigie Beach, which is a popular tourist attraction.

Historical airline service

British West Indies Airways (BWIA) was serving Vigie Field (which was the previous name of the airport) as early as 1950 with flights operated one or more days of the week to Barbados, Grenada, Port of Spain, Trinidad, Martinique, Guadeloupe, Antigua and St. Kitts operated with Lockheed Lodestar prop aircraft.  By 1965, BWIA was operating daily flights into the airport with Vickers Viscount turboprop airliners on a round trip routing of Port of Spain - Grenada - Barbados - St. Lucia - Martinique - Guadeloupe - Antigua. The same year, Leeward Islands Air Transport was operating a round trip flight six days a week on a routing of Antigua - Guadeloupe - Dominica - Martinique - St. Lucia - St. Vincent with Hawker Siddeley HS 748 turboprop aircraft.  By the summer of 2001, American Eagle was operating six daily flights from the airport nonstop to San Juan on behalf of American Airlines via a code sharing agreement with these services being flown by San Juan-based Executive Airlines with ATR-42 and ATR-72 turboprop aircraft.

Renaming of airport

The airport was renamed on 4 August 1997 in honour of Saint Lucia politician Sir George Frederick Lawrence Charles (1916–2004).  The airport had previously been known as Vigie Field.

Traffic

On average, George F. L. Charles Airport handles 32,000 flights per year carrying 394,000 passengers. Most of these flights operate with turboprop aircraft such as the ATR 72-500 or the de Havilland Canada DHC-8 Dash 8.

The airport currently has no scheduled jet service. All jet services into St. Lucia, including transatlantic flights, operate at the present time via Hewanorra International Airport, located on the southeast portion of the island.

Previous jet service

The airport previously had scheduled passenger jet service flown by Caribair (Puerto Rico) which in 1968 was operating McDonnell Douglas DC-9-30 jetliners on a daily basis with nonstop flights to Antigua and Barbados with direct jet service to Port of Spain, Trinidad, St. Maarten, San Juan, Puerto Rico, St. Croix and St. Thomas.  In 1973, Leeward Islands Air Transport (LIAT) was operating stretched British Aircraft Corporation BAC One-Eleven series 500 twin jets on nonstop flights to Antigua, Barbados and Fort-de-France, Martinique as well as direct, no change of plane jet service with the BAC One-Eleven to Port of Spain, Trinidad, St. Maarten and San Juan, Puerto Rico.  In 1995, Carib Express was operating British Aerospace BAe 146-100 jet flights into the airport nonstop from Barbados, Dominica and St. Vincent as well as one stop BAe 146 service from Port of Spain and St. Kitts.  Another previous jet operator was BWIA West Indies Airways (operating as BWIA International at the time) which in 1996 was operating McDonnell Douglas MD-80 jetliners between the airport and Miami twice a week and also twice a week between the airport and New York JFK Airport with both of these direct, no change of plane flights making an intermediate stop in Antigua as well as flying MD-80 service several days a week nonstop to Barbados with these flights then continuing on to Port of Spain.

Airlines and destinations

Passenger

Cargo

Other facilities
The airport houses the George Charles Outstation of the Eastern Caribbean Civil Aviation Authority, General Aviation Services, and the Island Flyers Club.

Navigation
The airport offers an RNAV and NDB approach only on Runway 9. Landings on Runway 27 are strictly visual.

Accidents and incidents 
On 8 November 2015, a Beechcraft Model 99, registered N7994H, veered off the runway into a grassy area at George F. L. Charles Airport after the aircraft's right landing gear malfunctioned. The sole occupant of the aircraft, the pilot, was not harmed. Following the incident, Hummingbird Air suspended all operations, and the Eastern Caribbean Civil Aviation Authority launched an investigation.

References

Airports in Saint Lucia
Buildings and structures in Castries